Oleg Gudymo (born 11 September 1944 in Alma-Ata, Kazakh SSR) is a Transnistrian politician who serves as a deputy in the Transnistrian Supreme Council. From 1993 until 2005 he was first deputy minister for national security. He is major general of the Transnistrian Ministry of State Security. He is an ethnic Russian. He has also become a member of the Joint Control Commission for maintaining peace in the zone of the War of Transnistria on 28 December 1992. In December 2005 Gudymo was elected to the Transnistrian parliament and became chairman of the parliamentarian security committee. In April 2007 the Committee for Security, Defense and Peacekeeping merged with the Committee for Law-enforcement Agencies, combating Corruption, Protection of Rights and Freedoms of Citizens, and Gudymo neither became chairman nor member of the new committee.

He is the founder and leader of the political party People's Will of Pridnestrovie which advocates independent statehood and international recognition for Transnistria.

In June 2015 Oleg Gudymo was deported from Moldova to Russia.

See also
 People's Will of Pridnestrovie

References

External links 
 PMR Parliament: Oleg Gudymo official biography
 Tiraspol Times: "New political party "People's Will" founded by Members of Parliament"

1944 births
Living people
People from Almaty
Transnistrian people of Russian descent
People's Will (Transnistria) politicians